Bărbătești is a commune in Gorj County, Oltenia, Romania. It is composed of four villages: Bărbătești, Musculești, Petrești and Socu.

References

Communes in Gorj County
Localities in Oltenia